Holy Martyrs Armenian Elementary and Ferrahian High School is an Armenian-American private school located in the San Fernando Valley of Los Angeles, United States. The school has two campuses: the high school, middle school and main offices, which are located in Encino, and the kindergarten and elementary school, which are located in North Hills. The school is part of the Western Prelacy of Armenian Schools, which seeks to promote bilingual education and cultural growth to the city's Armenian community. Instruction is in Armenian and English. The school is accredited by WASC and earned its most recent six-year accreditation in spring 2007.

Students at Ferrahian High School are encouraged to take advantage of the extracurricular activities available. Some of them include: academic competitions, athletics, student council, student clubs and committees and yearbook editing. The school organizes a yearly trip to Armenia for its junior class.

History
The school was established in 1964, making it the oldest daily Armenian school in the United States. The first classes were held on September 14 of that year. It was initially established in an Encino ranch house. At the end of the first school year, 47 students graduated.

By January 1986 the Holy Martyrs Armenian Elementary School, then in Encino, stated that violence in the Middle East had caused an increase in Student enrollment around 1985; as of that time the school had 650 students while it had a legal limit of 350 students. Homeowners in the area and a LDS Church, protested and sent complaints citing noise and traffic. In September 1985 the church sent a complaint document to the Los Angeles City Council that was ten pages long. The school argued that the community benefited because the recent immigrants attending did not burden the public school system.

A zoning administrator for the city ruled that the Holy Martyrs school was required to reduce its enrollment to the legal limit but the city council voted 13–1 to overturn this ruling. It imposed 24 conditions that the school was to obey as a compromise.

By August 1997 a total of around 1,000 students had graduated from the Ferrahian school. As of August 1997, of all schools in California, Ferrahian had the third largest Armenian student population.

See also
 History of the Armenian Americans in Los Angeles

References

External links
 

High schools in the San Fernando Valley
Private K-12 schools in California
Armenian-American culture in Los Angeles
Armenian-American private schools
Educational institutions established in 1964
1964 establishments in California
Schools in Los Angeles
High schools in Los Angeles
Encino, Los Angeles